Paul Raoult (born 26 November 1944 in Rieux-en-Cambrésis) is a former member of the Senate of France, who represented the Nord department from 1992 to 2011 as a member of the Socialist Party.

References
Page on the Senate website 

1944 births
Living people
French Senators of the Fifth Republic
Socialist Party (France) politicians
Senators of Nord (French department)
Place of birth missing (living people)